A Stray Goat is a 2016 South Korean film written and directed by Cho Jae-min and starring Park Jin-young and Ji Woo. The film marks Park Jin-young's big screen debut.

The film was premiered at the 17th Jeonju International Film Festival on April 30, 2016 and was theatrically released on March 1, 2017.

Synopsis
Min-sik moves to a rural village in Gyeongsang Province with his family. He meets Ye-joo, a classmate who is bullied by others due to her father being accused of murder.

Cast
 Park Jin-young as Jo Min-sik
 Ji Woo as Yang Ye-joo
 Shin Ahn-jin as Hyun-oh
 Jung Na-on as Mi-hee
 Jang Myung-gab as Yang Sang-man
 Kim Ki-joo as Nam-gon
 Lee Tae-joon as Sang-deuk
 Lee Chan-hee as Jin-ho
 Jang Hee-ryung as Soo-jung
 Park Ga-young as Yoo-kyung
 Lee Hae-sung as Tae-soo
 Kim Seung-tae as Butler

Production
A Stray Goat was produced by Myung Films, the production company which produced Joint Security Area, Architecture 101 and Cart. It is a production by the first term students of Myung Film Movie School which was set up by Myung Films. It is also Cho Jae-min's directorial debut.

References

External links
 
 

2016 films
South Korean drama films
Myung Films films
2010s South Korean films